Mrinal Pande (born 26 February 1946) is an Indian television personality, journalist and author, and until 2009 chief editor of Hindi daily Hindustan.

Early life and education
Pande was born in Tikamgarh, Madhya Pradesh, 26 February 1946. She studied initially at Nainital and then completed her Master's degree from Allahabad University.

Career 
In her report on the life of indian women in the countryside (2003), she criticizes the widespread taboo in India of everything to do with the body and sexuality.

She was awarded the Padma Shri in  2006 for her services in the field of journalism.

Bibliography
Devi, Tales of the Goddess in our time; 2000, Viking/Penguin.
Daughter's Daughter, 1993. Penguin Books.
That Which Ram Hath Ordained, 1993, Seagull Books.
The Subject is Woman, 1991. Sanchar Publishing House, New Delhi.
My Own Witness, 2001, Penguin, New Delhi,.#
Stepping Out · Life and Sexuality in Rural India, 2003, Gardners Books.
The Other Country: Dispatches from the Mofussil, 2012, Penguin, New Delhi.

See also
 List of Indian writers
 Kumauni people

References

External links
 
 The hindi media and an unreal discourse an article in The Hindu
 The games of masking from reality an article in The Hindu

Works online
 Chimgadadein, a short story by Mrinal Pande
 'Bitch', a short story by Mrinal Pande
 Bibbo, a short story by Mrinal Pande
 Mrinal Pande's article: India’s nurseries of politics
 Mrinal Pande columns at Mint (newspaper)

1946 births
Living people
Indian women journalists
Indian newspaper editors
Indian women television presenters
Indian television presenters
Indian women newspaper editors
University of Allahabad alumni
Indian columnists
Journalists from Madhya Pradesh
Indian women columnists
Recipients of the Padma Shri in literature & education
Indian women novelists
20th-century Indian novelists
20th-century Indian women writers
20th-century Indian journalists
21st-century Indian women writers
21st-century Indian novelists
21st-century Indian journalists
Women writers from Madhya Pradesh
Novelists from Madhya Pradesh